CX-516 is an ampakine and nootropic that acts as an AMPA receptor positive allosteric modulator and had been undergoing development by a collaboration between Cortex, Shire, and Servier. It was studied as a potential treatment for Alzheimer's disease under the brand name Ampalex, and was also being examined as a treatment for ADHD.

CX-516 was the first ampakine compound developed by Cortex and while it showed good in vitro activity and positive results in animal tests, the human trials proved disappointing due mainly to low potency and short half-life. However, CX-516 is still widely used in animal research into the ampakine drugs and is the standard reference compound that newer, more potent drugs of this class such as farampator and CX-717 are compared to.

See also 
 AMPA receptor positive allosteric modulator

References 
 

Ampakines
Stimulants
AMPA receptor positive allosteric modulators
1-Piperidinyl compounds
Carboxamides
Quinoxalines
Abandoned drugs